Judge's Cave is a cave in the British Overseas Territory of Gibraltar. Human remains dated to the late prehistoric period have been unearthed in the cave.

Discovery
Judge's Cave was discovered in the 1840s during the construction of a villa for James Cochrane who was Chief Justice of Gibraltar from 1841 to 1877. The cave was of some importance as it contained human remains and early visitors to the cave included Abbe Henri Breil, George Busk and local William Willoughby Cole Verner.

The human remains from this site have been described as being Neolithic and are currently held by the British Museum. This includes the skulls and thigh bones of two individuals. Gibraltarian cave enthusiast George Palao later visited the cave between January and April 1969 in which time he carried out excavations which produced various ceramic artifacts which are now kept at the Gibraltar Museum. The pottery remains excavated by Palao from this site are described as some of Gibraltar's most beautiful pieces.

Another interesting note is that Captain Gorham visited the cave during his time in Gibraltar alongside his team consisting of Lt. Anderson & Sgt. Mathews. Captain Gorham, best known for the discovery and naming of Gorham's Cave, was a keen explorer and left an inscription within Judge’s cave marking his visit on 12 December 1906. Having visited the site, we would also like to point out that there are areas of archaeological deposits which remain ‘un-excavated’ and could very possibly yield more Human remains Judges cave has recently been surveyed to the ‘Grade 6’ level of accuracy by a team of Spanish professional speleologists (Jose & Julio Aguilera) working alongside the Gibraltar Museum’s Team and another survey was carried out separately by the Gibraltar Museum's Caving unit on 12 September 2012. The site has a total depth of 47 meters below the current ground level and a total length of 250 meters. Considering the site is 74 meters above sea level this makes its bottom chambers only 27 meters above sea level. Judge’s Cave is an extensive system based on various levels. At this stage we would like to point out that we do not rule out the possibility that this site may have other large chambers which are yet to be discovered. There is also a possibility that this cave could link up with other cave systems which are nearby.

References
This page uses freely licensed text generously shared by underground-gibraltar.com

Caves of Gibraltar